Tête à Tete is an album by pianist Tete Montoliu's Trio recorded in 1976 and released on the Danish label SteepleChase.

Reception

Ken Dryden of AllMusic said "This is an essential CD for fans of the late Tete Montoliu."

Track listing
 "What's New?" (Bob Haggart, Johnny Burke)11:06
 "We'll Be Together Again" (Carl T. Fischer, Frankie Laine)9:05
 "Catalan Suite" (Tete Montoliu)20:01

Personnel
Tete Montoliupiano
Niels-Henning Ørsted Pedersenbass
Albert Heathdrums

References

Tete Montoliu albums
1976 albums
SteepleChase Records albums